Abdul Mannan (born 23 September 1944; known as Professor Abdul Mannan) is a Bangladesh Awami League politician and a former Jatiya Sangsad member from Meherpur-1 constituency during 1991–1996 and again, 1999–2001.

References

Living people
1944 births
Awami League politicians
5th Jatiya Sangsad members
Place of birth missing (living people)